The tenth season of Saturday Night Live, an American sketch comedy series, originally aired in the United States on NBC between October 6, 1984, and April 13, 1985. Only 17 episodes were produced due to a writers' strike and budget constraints.

Changes to format
This season also featured a new opening sequence produced by Charlex (who also created The Cars' "You Might Think" video earlier in 1984), depicting the SNL cast as giants in and around New York City landmarks. At the end of the season, Ebersol requested to completely revamp the show to include mostly prerecorded segments. Short, Guest, and Hall ultimately got tired of the show's demanding production schedule and showed little interest in returning for another season, leaving Crystal the only "A-cast" member available for season 11. Like Lorne Michaels at the end of season5, Ebersol made taking the show off the air for several months to re-cast and rebuild a condition of his return. Another idea was to institute a permanent rotation of hosts (Billy Crystal, David Letterman and Joe Piscopo) for "a hip The Ed Sullivan Show". After briefly canceling the show, NBC decided to continue production only if they could get Michaels to produce again. Ebersol, along with his writing staff and most of the cast, left the show after this season. Those who wished to stay, such as Crystal, were not rehired for the following season.

Cast
During the previous season, Eddie Murphy left the show mid season. Because of Murphy's departure Joe Piscopo also left the show because he did not want to do it without Murphy. Dick Ebersol fired Robin Duke, Brad Hall and Tim Kazurinsky. Ebersol then wanted to blow up the show by adding seasoned comedians instead of newcomers. He hired Billy Crystal (who hosted twice in season9 and was originally set to appear in SNL's first episode), Christopher Guest (a frequent contributor to The National Lampoon Radio Hour in the early 1970s), Rich Hall (best known for his work on "Not Necessarily the News" and the early 1980s ABC sketch show "Fridays"), Harry Shearer (who was a cast member on SNL in season 5), Martin Short (from "SCTV") and New Zealander Pamela Stephenson (from "Not The Nine O'Clock News"). Christopher Guest became the anchor of Saturday Night News. All of the cast members left the show at the end of the season. According to IMDb, future cast member Jan Hooks, SCTV cast member Andrea Martin, and actress Kathy Najimy auditioned for a spot in the season as Duke's replacement, but all three lost to Stephenson. Hooks then auditioned the following season (only to lose to Joan Cusack) and later joined the show in season 12 when Lorne Michaels was forced to revamp his show after NBC threatened to cancel it.

In the middle of the season, Harry Shearer left the show due to "creative differences". Shearer told the AP, "I was creative, and they were different." Despite his departure, his image is still shown in the opening credits (spray-painting an elevated train as it goes down the track).

Cast roster
Repertory players
Jim Belushi
Billy Crystal
Mary Gross
Christopher Guest
Rich Hall
Gary Kroeger
Julia Louis-Dreyfus
Harry Shearer (final episode: January 12, 1985)
Martin Short
Pamela Stephenson

Writers

Billy Crystal, Larry David, Christopher Guest, Rich Hall, Rob Riley, and Martin Short joined the writing staff. Jim Downey, Herb Sargent, and Harry Shearer rejoined the staff after a four-year hiatus. Robin Duke, Adam Green, Tim Kazurinsky, Michael McCartney, Eddie Murphy, Pamela Norris, and Joe Piscopo left the staff.

This season's writers were Jim Belushi, Andy Breckman, Billy Crystal, Larry David, Jim Downey, Christopher Guest, Rich Hall, Nate Herman, Kevin Kelton, Andy Kurtzman, Margaret Oberman, Rob Riley, Herb Sargent, Martin Short, Harry Shearer, Andrew Smith, Bob Tischler and Eliot Wald. The head writer was Bob Tischler.

Episodes

Specials

References

10
1984 American television seasons
1985 American television seasons
Saturday Night Live in the 1980s